Veronica Falls is the self-titled debut album by English indie pop band Veronica Falls. The album was released on September 20, 2011, in the United States through Slumberland Records, and in the European Union through Bella Union.

History
In 2010, Veronica Falls released two singles - "Found Love in a Graveyard" and "Beachy Head" - on the American label Captured Tracks.

After releasing their first two singles, the band released their self-titled debut album in September 2011 on Slumberland Records in the United States and Bella Union in the European Union, to generally favorable reviews. The album was recorded with veteran producer Guy Fixsen. The album was followed by a single, "Bad Feeling", in August 2011.

Reception

Veronica Falls received positive reviews from music critics. At Metacritic, which assigns a normalized rating out of 100 to reviews from mainstream critics, the album received an average score of 71 based on 19 reviews, indicating "generally favourable reviews". AllMusic critic Tim Sendra wrote that Veronica Falls "sounds effortless and truly organic in the best sense of the word, like four people blending together to make one perfectly formed sound." Dom Gourlay of Drowned in Sound called it "an album with no discernible weak links", noting that "the final quarter is where Veronica Falls finds itself elevated alongside 2011's best." Nows Joanne Huffa wrote that despite the songs' "effortlessly crafted" sound, "there's a complexity to the melodies and structures that surprises on repeat listens." Pitchforks Lindsay Zoladz noted "a striking physicality to these songs, and Guy Fixsen and Ash Workman's production makes every tambourine beat hit with the clarity of a shattering window." Jon Caramanica of The New York Times wrote, "The boy-girl harmonies on this album at least suggest the possibility of outside points of view, but really, Ms. Clifford's tension is everything."

Consequence of Sounds Andy Morgan concluded that while the album's "sense of restraint feels deliberate, it does raise hopes that the band will fully go off the deep end the next time around. Nevertheless, Veronica Falls is an overall engaging album of contrasts." Ben Hewitt of BBC Music wrote that "Despite the odd patch of fluffier filler, it's still filled with enough dark delights to send tingles up and down your spine." Barry Nicolson of NME was more reserved in his praise and wrote that while Veronica Falls are "a hard band to fall in love with, this record is ridiculously easy to admire." Helen Clarke of MusicOMH felt that the band "have carved into a niche that will always have a small but loyal following which will baffle those on the outside. Newcomers would do well to do their homework first, and enjoy this debut with a thousand points of reference."

Veronica Falls was placed at number six in Rough Trade's year-end list of the best albums of 2011.

Track listing

Chart positions

Tour Dates
Tour dates confirmed by the band official website

(*) These shows featured with Dum Dum Girls
(^) This show featured with Wild Flag

Personnel
Additional credits confirmed by Allmusic:

Veronica Falls
 Roxanne Clifford - lead vocals, guitar
 Patrick Doyle - drums, vocals
 Marion Herbain - bass guitar
 James Hoare - guitar, vocals

Production
 Engineering - Ash Workman, Simon Trout, Guy Fixsen
 Mastering - Guy Davie
 Mixing - Ash Workman, Woodie Taylor
 Vocal Engineer - Charlie Alex March

See also

References

2011 albums
Veronica Falls albums